This is a list of Zimbabwean women Twenty20 International cricketers.  A Twenty20 International is an international cricket match between two representative teams, each having Twenty20 International status, as determined by the International Cricket Council (ICC). A Twenty20 International is played under the rules of Twenty20 cricket.

Key

List of Players
Last updated 25 September 2022. This list includes all players who have played at least one T20I match and is initially arranged in the order of debut appearance. Where more than one player won their first cap in the same match, those players are initially listed alphabetically at the time of debut.

See also
List of Zimbabwe women ODI cricketers

References

 
Zimbabwe
Women Twenty